Turbonilla erythrosclera is a species of sea snail, a marine gastropod mollusk in the family Pyramidellidae, the pyrams and their allies.

Description
The shell grows to a length of  4 mm.

Distribution
This marine species occurs of St. Thomas, Virgin Islands, Lesser Antilles.

References

External links
 To Encyclopedia of Life
 To World Register of Marine Species

erythrosclera
Gastropods described in 1875